Homo Faber is a novel by Swiss author Max Frisch, first published in Germany in 1957. The first English translation was published in Britain in 1959. The novel is written as a first-person narrative. The protagonist, Walter Faber, is a successful engineer traveling throughout Europe and the Americas on behalf of UNESCO. His world view based on logic, probability, and technology is challenged by a  series of incredible coincidences as his repressed past and chance occurrences come together to break up his severely rational, technically oriented ideology.

Plot
During the 1930s, Walter Faber, who works at the Swiss Federal Institute of Technology Zurich (ETH Zurich), meets the art student Hanna. The two become lovers, and one day Hanna reveals that she is pregnant. Faber asks her to marry him, but she hesitates. Faber receives an offer from Escher Wyss to work in Baghdad and he accepts it; he and Hanna split up. Before his departure, Faber asks his friend Joachim to take care of Hanna, and Hanna agrees to abort their child.

In spring 1957, Faber recounts the events of his travels in America. On a flight from New York to Mexico, his plane makes a forced landing in the desert. During the following stay he meets the German Herbert, who turns out to be the brother of Joachim, Faber's friend. Faber had not heard from his friend since 1936. Faber decides to accompany Herbert, who is on his way to visiting his brother. After an odyssey through the wilderness, they reach Joachim's plantation. But Joachim has hanged himself. Herbert decides to stay behind and manage the plantation.

Faber returns to New York City, but meets up with his married mistress, Ivy. Looking to escape their relationship, Faber takes an unplanned cruise to Europe. On this journey, he meets a young woman Sabeth, with whom he falls in love. He proposes to Sabeth at the end of the journey, but she is traveling with a male friend. Faber and Sabeth meet again in Paris and Faber decides to go on vacation and accompany Sabeth on a road trip through Europe, where they also start a sexual relationship. Faber even calls the trip their "honeymoon".

Because of a foreboding, he asks Sabeth for the name of her mother and she replies "Hanna". Faber still hopes that Hanna had aborted their child, but it soon turns out that Sabeth is his daughter. In Greece, where Hanna now lives, a poisonous snake bites Sabeth. She falls backwards after seeing Walter come naked out of the ocean, and is soon rushed to the hospital by Faber. There he meets his former love Hanna again. Luckily Sabeth survives the snakebite. However she suddenly dies due to an untreated fracture in her skull caused by the fall. Faber feels a certain measure of guilt as he had not mentioned Sabeth falling.

Stricken by grief and stomach cancer, Faber realizes the beauty he has missed and finds redemption in Hanna. At the end of the narrative, Faber is in hospital facing an operation for his stomach cancer; he optimistically calculates the probability of his survival, and makes his last journal entry.

Characters
 Walter Faber is the protagonist of Homo Faber. He is an engineer and technologist who works for UNESCO. Born and educated in Switzerland, he now lives in an apartment in New York City, but travels extensively for work throughout Europe and South America. Walter has never been married.
 Sabeth, or Elisabeth, is the 20-year-old daughter of Walter and Hanna. Born in Switzerland, she believes that Joachim is her father. She speaks English, German, and French.
 Hanna Piper (née Landsberg) is the German-born half-Jewish mother of Sabeth. Formerly Walter's lover, she married Joachim, and then later married Herr Piper. She works at an art institute in Athens, Greece.
 Joachim Henke was Walter's German born friend, who was studying to be a doctor. He married Hanna, but they separated after she refused to have any more children with him. Sabeth believes that he is her father. After separating from Hanna, Joachim joined the German army and fought in World War II; Hanna and Sabeth never saw him again. Decades later, he moved to Guatemala to run a tobacco plantation. A few weeks after arriving, he committed suicide.
 Herbert Henke is Joachim's brother, who meets Walter on a plane. He is employed by the same company that sent Joachim to Guatemala.
 Ivy is Walter's married American mistress, who comes to New York once a week to see Walter and her psychiatrist.

Major themes
There are several major themes to the novel. The theme of technology as philosophy describes the belief that everything is possible and that technology allows people to control all aspects of their lives. This view is contradicted throughout the novel by events. Technical breakdowns mark key points in the story (and Walter's life) right up to the upcoming operation that he mentions at the very end, which is thus implied to result in his death.

Faber's dismissal of literature and of anything to do with myths and the arts also plays into the theme of fate versus coincidence, which is preeminent in the plot. Faber is oblivious to the various mythological motifs and twists which bring his story close to a modern tragedy, even as it unfolds in Greece and Rome of all places. Also, the events in Homo Faber are presented in such a way as to seem either a string of coincidences resulting in an unlikely outcome, or a sequence of predestined actions and decisions leading to a necessary outcome. This dichotomy is reflected in a larger series of seeming antinomies: faith or reason, modern knowledge or ancient beliefs, free will or predestination. Walter never resolves this conflict. 

The theme of travel plays an important role in the novel. Using many modes of transportation,  Walter is constantly on the move, visiting several continents, almost a dozen countries, and dozens of cities, for business and pleasure. This constant travel underscores Walter's sense of dislocation; he has no family, no real home, and no real country. Through travel, Walter is able to avoid permanent connections, to escape responsibilities, and to remain completely unknown and unjudged.

Publication history
Homo Faber was first published in 1957 in Frankfurt, Germany by Suhrkamp Verlag. The first English edition, translated by Michael Bullock, was published in 1959 in London by Abelard-Schuman. The book has been translated into numerous languages, and has appeared in numerous editions, both in hardcover and paperback.

Adaptations
The novel was made into a 1991 film, Voyager, directed by Volker Schlöndorff, and starring Sam Shepard and Julie Delpy.

References

External links
 Daynard, Jodi. "Max Frisch, The Art of Fiction No. 113" in The Paris Review, Winter 1989. Retrieved: 2011-11-21.

1957 novels
Swiss novels adapted into films
Novels by Max Frisch
Swiss speculative fiction novels
Incest in fiction